George B. French (April 14, 1883 – June 9, 1961) was an American film actor. He appeared in more than 90 films between the mid-1910s and early 1940s.

Selected filmography

 Wanted: A Leading Lady (1915)
 Tarzan of the Apes (1918)
 The Romance of Tarzan (1918)
 The Adventures of Tarzan (1921)
 Tire Trouble (1924)
 Commencement Day (1924)
 Reckless Romance (1924)
 Wandering Husbands (1924)
 Charley's Aunt (1925)
 Bashful Buccaneer (1925)
 Boys Will Be Joys (1925)
 The Snob Buster (1925)
 Thundering Fleas (1926)
 Red Hot Leather (1926)
 Shivering Spooks (1926)
 Lazy Lightning (1926)
 Horse Shoes (1927)
 Ten Years Old (1927)
 The Lost Limited (1927)
 One Glorious Scrap (1927)
 The Battle of the Century (1927)
 The Smile Wins (1928)
 The Black Pearl (1928)
 Barnum & Ringling, Inc. (1928)
 Won in the Clouds (1928)
 The Sawdust Paradise (1928)
 Man on the Flying Trapeze (1935)
 Way Down East (1935)
 Shakedown (1936)

References

External links

1883 births
1961 deaths
American male film actors
Male actors from Iowa
People from Storm Lake, Iowa
20th-century American male actors
Burials at Forest Lawn Memorial Park (Glendale)